Roger Craig Smithberg (born March 21, 1966) is a former Major League Baseball pitcher who played for two seasons. He pitched for the Oakland Athletics for 13 games during the 1993 Oakland Athletics season and two games during the 1994 Oakland Athletics season.

External links

1966 births
Living people
Major League Baseball pitchers
Oakland Athletics players
Riverside Red Wave players
Las Vegas Stars (baseball) players
Wichita Wranglers players
High Desert Mavericks players
Reno Silver Sox players
Huntsville Stars players
Tacoma Tigers players
Bradley Braves baseball players
Baseball players from Illinois
Sportspeople from Elgin, Illinois
Alaska Goldpanners of Fairbanks players